Héloïse Martin (born 27 June 1996) is a French actress.

Filmography

Theater

References

External links

French film actresses
21st-century French actresses
Living people
1996 births